20/20: In an Instant (or In an Instant) is an American documentary series on ABC. The show premiered on March 6, 2015, before moving to its regular timeslot on Fridays at 9:00 pm. The show follows people who have gone through life changing events as they come to terms and relive the moments.

On May 24, 2016, the show was renewed for a second season, which premiered on June 18, 2016, and ran for six consecutive weeks. The season finale aired on July 23, 2016. On May 19, 2017, the show was renewed for a third season, which premiered on June 3, 2017.

Series overview

Episodes

Season 1 (2015)

Season 2 (2016)

Season 3 (2017-2018)

References

External links
 

2010s American documentary television series
2015 American television series debuts
2018 American television series endings
American Broadcasting Company original programming